The 2018 Casino Admiral Trophy was a professional tennis tournament played on clay courts. It was the first edition of the tournament which was part of the 2018 ATP Challenger Tour. It took place in Marbella, Spain between 26 and 31 March 2018.

Singles main-draw entrants

Seeds

 1 Rankings are as of 19 March 2018.

Other entrants
The following players received wildcards into the singles main draw:
  Alejandro Davidovich Fokina
  Pedro Martínez
  Jürgen Melzer
  Alexei Popyrin

The following player received entry into the singles main draw as an alternate:
  Enrique López Pérez

The following players received entry from the qualifying draw:
  Pedro Cachín
  Kimmer Coppejans
  Lukáš Rosol
  Marco Trungelliti

The following player received entry as a lucky loser:
  Sumit Nagal

Champions

Singles

 Stefano Travaglia def.  Guido Andreozzi 6–3, 6–3.

Doubles

 Guido Andreozzi /  Ariel Behar def.  Martin Kližan /  Jozef Kovalík 6–3, 6–4.

References

2018 ATP Challenger Tour
2018 in Spanish tennis